Percy Ross (November 22, 1916 – November 14, 2001) was an American multi-millionaire. He arrived in St. Louis Park, Minnesota around 1946–1947. He was associated with Ross and Ross Auctioneers. In 1959 he purchased a company called Poly-Tech, which made polyethylene plastic bags. He died in Edina, Minnesota on November 10, 2001.

Ross was best known for his philanthropy, particularly through his Thanks a Million newspaper column, wherein he would often grant requests for readers in need. Thanks a Million ran in over 800 publications for 17 years. It eventually became a syndicated radio show running on over 400 radio stations. From the column and shows, he gave away an estimated US$20 to $30 million over a period of 17 years.

Ross was born and raised in Laurium, Michigan, on the Keweenaw Peninsula of Michigan's upper peninsula, about 10 miles from Michigan Technological University.

References

General References 
Percy Ross, Columnist and Philanthropist, Dies at 84
Percy Ross, 84; Loved Giving Away Money
Thanks a Million
Zany Millionaire Percy Ross Has a Simple Credo—by His Gifts Ye Shall Know Him
"Percy Ross Wants to Give You Money!" (Longreads)

1916 births
2001 deaths
American columnists
People from Laurium, Michigan
20th-century American philanthropists